The Horse's Mouth is a 1958 film directed by Ronald Neame and filmed in Technicolor. Alec Guinness wrote the screenplay, which was based on the 1944 novel The Horse's Mouth by Joyce Cary. Guinness also played the lead role of Gulley Jimson, a London artist.

Plot
Eccentric painter Gulley Jimson is released from a one-month jail sentence for telephone harassment of his sponsor, Mr. Hickson. Nosey Barbon, who wants to be Jimson's protégé, greets Jimson at HM Prison Wormwood Scrubs, but Jimson tries to discourage Nosey from pursuing painting for a living. Jimson goes to his houseboat, which his older lady friend Coker has been maintaining in his absence.

Jimson tries to borrow money from Hickson and Coker. Jimson and Coker later visit Hickson to secure payment for Jimson's artwork. Jimson tries to steal works back from Hickson's place, but Coker stops him. Hickson calls the police, but Jimson and Coker escape.

Jimson responds to a note from A. W. Alabaster, secretary to Sir William and Lady Beeder, who are interested in acquiring Jimson's early works. Jimson and Coker try to secure one of those works from Sara Monday, Jimson's ex-wife, but she turns them down.

When Jimson visits the Beeders, he sees a blank wall in their residence and is inspired to paint The Raising of Lazarus. He learns that the Beeders are leaving for six weeks and takes advantage of their absence to execute the painting. An old artistic rival, Abel, intrudes on Jimson to bring in a large block of marble to fulfil a sculpture commission for British Rail. Jimson pawns the Beeders' valuables, and Abel and Jimson accidentally destroy part of the Beeders' floor when the marble is dropped. After Jimson has completed the painting, the Beeders return. Shocked by the painting, they fall through the hole in the floor.

Jimson returns to his houseboat and finds Coker there. She was fired from her barmaid job after the press reported the incident at Hickson's residence. Later that evening, she surprises Jimson with the news that Hickson is dead and that he has bequeathed his collection of Jimson's works "to the nation." Those works are displayed at the Tate Gallery, which Jimson visits. In the long queue for the exhibit, Jimson sees Sara. He again attempts to regain the piece in her possession, and she gives him a roll tube. When he returns to the houseboat, Coker and Nosey find that the roll contains only toilet paper. Nosey follows Jimson to Sara's house, where Sara is knocked unconscious when Jimson grabs the painting.

Jimson and Nosey seek shelter in an abandoned church. Jimson is immediately inspired to execute his largest work, The Last Judgment, on a blank wall. Learning that the church is to be torn down within a fortnight, Jimson, Nosey and Coker recruit local youngsters to help complete the painting. A local council official overseeing the building's demolition objects to their activities. Jimson recruits Lady Beeder to participate. The painting is completed on the scheduled day of demolition. After the demolition crew warns everyone to stand back, Jimson suddenly drives a bulldozer through the wall, feeling it necessary to destroy the work before anyone else did. Jimson runs back to his boat and sets sail down the Thames before Nosey and Coker can stop him.

Cast
 Alec Guinness as Gulley Jimson
 Kay Walsh as Miss D. Coker
 Renée Houston as Sara Monday
 Mike Morgan as Nosey
 Robert Coote as Sir William Beeder
 Arthur Macrae as A.W. Alabaster
 Veronica Turleigh as Lady Beeder
 Michael Gough as Abel [Bisson]
 Reginald Beckwith as Capt. Jones
 Ernest Thesiger as Hickson
 Gillian Vaughan as Lollie

Production
The film's Academy Award-nominated screenplay, written by Alec Guinness, generally follows the book upon which it was based. However, the screenplay focuses on Jimson's character and the life of an artist rather than on the social and political themes that the book explores. It also deviates from the book's ending, in which Jimson suffers a stroke and is no longer able to paint.

The expressionistic paintings featured in the film are actually the work of John Bratby, a member of the English provincial realist artist group known as the kitchen sink school. To prepare for the film, Guinness observed Bratby at work in his home studio.

Mike Morgan fell ill with meningitis shortly before filming ended and died before its completion. As a result, another actor dubbed many of Morgan's lines.

Director Ronald Neame visited author Joyce Cary, who was dying from bone cancer. Cary requested that his son Tristram, who had previously scored Guinness' The Ladykillers, be contracted to write the film's score. Neame conveyed to Tristram Cary that he wanted "something jaunty and cocky" in the manner of Sergei Prokoviev's Lieutenant Kijé. The score was arranged by Kenneth V. Jones.

Critical response
The film, which received rave reviews in the UK after its Royal Command Performance, has been named by one critic as "[q]uite probably the best film ever made about a painter." Scott Weinberg of the Apollo Guide described Guinness’ performance as "a devilishly enjoyable character study" that "ranges from 'mildly dishevelled’ to 'tragically exhausted’" and also praised Neame's direction. A contemporary Film Quarterly review by Henry Goodman identified the film's predominant theme of the artist as destroyer and praised the Gulley Jimson character as "a fine realization of the absurdities as well as the idealisms of the creative life."

See also
 The Rebel

References

External links
 
 
 
 
 The Horse's Mouth an essay by Ronald Neame at the Criterion Collection

1958 films
1950s screwball comedy films
British comedy films
Films about fictional painters
Films based on Irish novels
Films directed by Ronald Neame
Films produced by Ronald Neame
Films set in London
1958 comedy films
1950s English-language films
1950s British films